Melaleuca tinkeri is a plant in the myrtle family, Myrtaceae and is endemic to the south-west of Western Australia. It is one of the smallest melaleucas and is distinguished by its warty, hairy leaves, heads of pinkish flowers in late winter to spring and its spherical fruiting clusters.

Description
The younger leaves are covered with soft, silky hairs and the oil glands are raised, giving the leaves a warty appearance.

The flowers are pinkish to purple and are arranged in heads on the ends of branches which continue to grow after flowering and sometimes also in the upper leaf axils. The outer surface of the floral cup (the hypanthium) is hairy and there are five bundles of stamens around the flower, each with 3 to 6 stamens.

Taxonomy and naming
The specific epithet (tinkeri) honours Allan Tinker for his knowledge of the flora of the Eneabba area.

Distribution and habitat
This melaleuca occurs in the Nandanooka and Lesueur National Park areas in the Avon Wheatbelt and Geraldton Sandplains biogeographic regions. It grows in shallow, gravelly sand over laterite or granite.

Conservation
Melaleuca tinkeri is listed as "not threatened" by the Government of Western Australia Department of Parks and Wildlife.

References

tinkeri
Plants described in 1999
Endemic flora of Western Australia
Taxa named by Lyndley Craven